Florin Prunea (born 8 August 1968) is a Romanian former football goalkeeper.

Club career
Florin Prunea was born on 8 August 1968 in București, Romania and he started playing football at junior level in 1977 when he went to play for Steaua București but he was rejected, shortly afterwards going at rival, Dinamo București where coach Fane Stănculescu used him as a striker in his first three years, then he worked with Gheorghe Timar who started using him as a goalkeeper and in the later years of his youth career he was coached by Iosif Varga, also during his youth years he was teammate with future national team competitor, Bogdan Stelea. He made his Divizia A debut on 31 May 1986 under coach Mircea Lucescu in a 5–0 loss in front of Sportul Studențesc București, however he made only a few appearances in the first three seasons as his childhood idol, Dumitru Moraru was still the first choice goalkeeper of The Red Dogs so he and other players were sent to Universitatea Cluj in exchange for Ioan Sabău. After two seasons spent at "U" Cluj in which he was a first choice goalkeeper, he went to play for "U" Craiova where in his first season he helped the club win The Double, being used by coach Sorin Cârțu in 32 Divizia A matches who also used him in the 2–1 victory from the Cupa României final in front of FC Bacău. In 1992, Prunea returned at Dinamo, where he lived his most steady period, remaining with the team for six seasons but without winning any trophies. In the following years he switched many teams, first going for a second spell at "U" Cluj, then he had his first experience abroad by playing for Turkish Süper Lig side, Erzurumspor, afterwards he returned to Romania and played just one game in the 1999–2000 season for Astra Ploiești as he played for FC U Craiova for the rest of the season and had his second spell abroad, this time in Bulgaria at Litex Lovech where he was teammate with fellow Romanian, Valeriu Răchită, also being in the center of a controversy where he was accused of match fixing after a game against Levski Sofia. He returned for a third spell at Dinamo in the middle of the 2001–02 season by the end of which he helped the team win the 2000–01 Cupa României, being used by coach Cornel Dinu in the 4–2 victory from the final against Rocar București and in the following season he helped the team win the title but he made only 6 appearances, being the team's second choice goalkeeper behind Bogdan Lobonț. In the last years of his career, Prunea had two spells at FCM Bacău which were interfered by a period spent at FC Brașov, he had his third and final spell abroad at Super League Greece team, Skoda Xanthi where he was teammate with compatriot Stelian Carabaș and ended his career at Național București where he made his last Divizia A appearance on 5 November 2005 in a 3–2 loss against Oțelul Galați, gaining a total of 383 appearances in the competition and he also has a total of 17 appearances in European competitions (including 3 appearances in the Intertoto Cup).

International career
Florin Prunea played 40 games in which he conceded 24 goals at international level for Romania, making his debut on 5 December 1990 under coach Mircea Rădulescu in a 6–0 victory against San Marino at the Euro 1992 qualifiers in which he made a total of 3 appearances. He made three appearances at the successful 1994 World Cup qualifiers, being part of the "Golden Generation" that reached the quarter-finals of the final tournament, being used by coach Anghel Iordănescu in only one game from the group stage in which he kept a clean sheet in the 1–0 victory in front of the USA, as in the first two Bogdan Stelea was preferred, but Prunea played from the eight-finals onwards, rather badly when he conceded an easy goal from Balbo in the 75th minute of the eventual 3–2 victory due to splendid performances by Dumitrescu and Hagi in front of Argentina but another mistake in the quarter-final game against Sweden would not go by unpunished, where after a goal by Brolin in the 78th minute and double goals by Răducioiu in the 88th and 101st minute, the outcome seemed to be Romanian victory yet again when with five minutes to the final whistle, Prunea did not jump in time at a 40 meters cross and gave giant striker Kennet Andersson the chance to level the score to 2–2 so the game went on to penalties where Sweden won 5–4 after Petrescu and Belodedici could not defeat Thomas Ravelli. He played one game at the successful Euro 1996 qualifiers, also being used by Iordănescu in a 2–1 loss against Spain as Romania did not pass the group stage of the final tournament. He played two games at the successful 1998 World Cup qualifiers and was selected by Iordănescu to be part of the squad that went at the final tournament, however he did not made any appearances there. In his final years, Florin Prunea was selected by coach Emerich Jenei to be part of the squad that went at the Euro 2000 final tournament without playing and on 25 April 2001 he made his last appearance for the national team in a friendly which ended 0–0 in front of Slovakia.

For representing his country during 1990–2000 at the World and European Cups final tournaments, Prunea was decorated by President of Romania Traian Băsescu on 25 March 2008 with the Ordinul "Meritul Sportiv" – (The Medal "The Sportive Merit") class III.

Honours
Dinamo București
Divizia A: 2001–02
Cupa României: 1985–86, 2000–01
Universitatea Craiova
Divizia A: 1990–91
Cupa României: 1990–91
Litex Lovech
Bulgarian Cup: 2000–01

References

External links

1968 births
Living people
Footballers from Bucharest
Romanian footballers
Romania international footballers
Association football goalkeepers
1994 FIFA World Cup players
1998 FIFA World Cup players
UEFA Euro 1996 players
UEFA Euro 2000 players
FC Dinamo București players
FC Universitatea Cluj players
CS Universitatea Craiova players
FC Progresul București players
FC Brașov (1936) players
FCM Bacău players
PFC Litex Lovech players
Erzurumspor footballers
FC Astra Giurgiu players
Romanian expatriate footballers
Expatriate footballers in Greece
Expatriate footballers in Turkey
Expatriate footballers in Bulgaria
Xanthi F.C. players
Liga I players
First Professional Football League (Bulgaria) players
Süper Lig players
Romanian expatriate sportspeople in Bulgaria
Romanian sports executives and administrators